This is a compilation of the results of the teams representing Germany at official international women's football competitions, that is the UEFA Women's Cup and its successor, the UEFA Women's Champions League.

Germany has been the most successful association in the competition with nine titles split between Frankfurt (4), Turbine Potsdam (2), Wolfsburg (2) and Duisburg (1) in nineteen editions as of the 2019–20 season, taking part in all finals but four. It is ranked second at the competition's association standings behind France, and it has held two spots since the 2009–10 season.

Teams
These are the five teams that have represented Germany in the UEFA Women's Cup and the UEFA Women's Champions League.

Qualification

1 Didn't qualify through the national championship, but as defending champions.

Historical progression

Results by team

Bayern Munich

Duisburg

Frankfurt

Turbine Potsdam

Wolfsburg

References

Women's football clubs in international competitions
Women